The VLF Destino is a proposed automobile from American car company VLF Automotive. The Destino is a large four-door sedan and was first shown to the public at the North American International Auto Show in January 2013 as the VL Destino, and subsequently the WM Destino, before being named VLF Destino in January 2016. Sales were expected to commence in 2014, but the expected start of sales was later pushed back to 2016.

History
The Destino is based on the Fisker Karma which ceased production in 2012. VL had obtained twenty Karma "gliders" from Fisker Automotive, and reported 100 orders by May 2013. Sales of the Destino were originally scheduled to commence in the second half of 2013, but the start was pushed back to 2014, due to the ongoing restructuring of Fisker.

The Destino retains the Karma interior  and most exterior panels, but removes the Karma's electric motor and battery system, and installs a General Motors LS9 6.2-litre V-8 gasoline engine producing 638 hp (476 kW; 647 PS) and 604 lbf·ft (819 N·m) of torque fitted with a 6-speed automatic transmission. The main alterations to the exterior are to the front grille design and rear bumper and trunk lid.

In May 2014 VL merged with WM GreenTech Automotive, and resulted in the car being renamed WM Destino by its new owners.

In January 2016, the car was renamed as the VLF Destino V8, to mark the creation of the new company VLF Automotive.

It is planned that the cars will be built in Auburn Hills in Michigan.

The manufacturer proposes a sale price of 200,000.

Technical
Unlike the discontinued hybrid Fisker Karma, the Destino is powered by a traditional gasoline engine from GM manufactured to power Chevrolets and Cadillacs. The 6.2-litre (6162 cc) V8 supercharged LS9 engine is front mid-mounted and powers the rear wheels. Producing 638 hp at 6,500 rpm and torque of 604 lb-ft (819 Nm) at 3,800 rpm, the Destino is claimed to accelerate 0-60 mph in 3.9 seconds and reach a maximum speed of 200 mph.

References

External links

WM Destino Specification

Luxury vehicles
Sedans
Cars introduced in 2016
Henrik Fisker